Emre Nasuh (born 1 January 2001) is a Turkish professional footballer who plays as a midfielder for Darıca Gençlerbirliği.

Professional career
Nasuh made his professional debut with Fenerbahçe in a 3-1 Süper Lig win over Çaykur Rizespor on 25 July 2020.

References

External links
 
 
 

2001 births
People from Yüreğir
Living people
Turkish footballers
Association football midfielders
Fenerbahçe S.K. footballers
Turgutluspor footballers
Darıca Gençlerbirliği footballers
Süper Lig players
TFF Second League players
TFF Third League players
Sportspeople from Adana